Nilesh Lamichaney (born 4 September 1991) is an Indian cricketer. He made his List A debut for Sikkim in the 2018–19 Vijay Hazare Trophy on 20 September 2018.

Having been Sikkim's outstanding batsman in under-age competitions, he was appointed to captain Sikkim in their inaugural competition at List A level. In Sikkim's second match he became the first player to score a century for Sikkim, when he made 123 against Arunachal Pradesh on 21 September 2018.

He made his first-class debut for Sikkim in the 2018–19 Ranji Trophy on 1 November 2018. He made his Twenty20 debut for Sikkim in the 2018–19 Syed Mushtaq Ali Trophy on 21 February 2019.

References

External links
 

1991 births
Living people
Indian cricketers
Sikkim cricketers
Place of birth missing (living people)